The Brazilian Army Aviation Command is a component of the Brazilian Army containing the army's helicopter units.

Tasks 
The task of the Brazilian Army Aviation Command is to provide organic airmobility and support the ground forces by providing tactical air support, close air support and reconnaissance.

History
The origin of the Brazilian Army Aviation lies in the Paraguayan War, with on the one side Brazil, Argentina and Uruguay (the Triple Alliance) and on the other Paraguay, when the commander-in-chief of the Brazilian forces, Duke of Caxias, deployed observation balloons in the field to observe the enemy troops.

One of the first army aviators was Ricardo Kirk during the Contestado War 1912–1916, using monoplanes to support ground forces. These missions were predominantly flown for reconnaissance purposes.

In 1941, upon the creation of the Aeronautics Ministry and of the Brazilian Air Force (FAB), Military Aviation, which was the name of the army branch that operated the aircraft, ended its operations as all flying tasks brought under the aegis of the Brazilian Air Force.

In 1986 Brazilian army aviation was re-established to operate helicopters in support of the Brazilian Army. An Army Aviation Material Directorate (DMAvEx), 1st Army Aviation Brigade and 1st Army Aviation Battalion were formed. Taubaté was chosen as garrison, suitably located in the country's greatest industrial and population concentration between Rio de Janeiro and São Paulo. Its rebirth is related to the local production of Helibras, located in Itajubá, Minas Gerais, also in the industrial heartland of Brazil. The initial inventory concentrated on helicopter types, which have dual civilian and military application. As such in 1987 an order was placed with the enterprise. The Helibras HB 350 L1 - Esquilo (license production of the Eurocopter AS350L1) became Attack Helicopter - 1 with 16 units on order and the Eurocopter AS365 Dauphin in its military version SA.365 K Pantera (later rebranded as Eurocopter AS565 Panther) became Maneuver Helicopter - 1 with an order for 36 units. The first helicopter was handed over to the Army in April 1989, an HA-1 Esquilo nr. EB-1001.

In July 1993 the 1st Army Aviation Brigade was transformed into the Army Aviation Command. Two new units officially stood up at Taubaté on August 17, 1993. On that day the army aviation changed the designation of its operational units from battalions to squadrons and the two new units and the 1st Army Aviation Battalion were combined into a newly formed 1st Group of Army Aviation. Correspondingly the  became 1st Squadron / 1st Group of Army Aviation, the second unit became 2nd Squadron / 1st Group of Army Aviation and the third unit became 3rd Squadron / 1st Group of Army Aviation. The expansion of the Brazilian army aviation necessitated the acquisition of additional helicopters to fill the inventory and new helicopters were ordered. These were 20 units of the improved military version Eurocopter Fennec AS 550 A2, which retained HA-1 designation and the name  (Squirrel) in Brazilian Army service. The fleets of HB 350 L1, HB 550 A2 and AS.365K were reshuffled between the three squadrons correspondingly.

In February 1991 the Revolutionary Armed Forces of Colombia made an incursion into Brazilian territory and an air unit of 2 HA-1s and 2 HM-1s was deployed from Taubaté to provide air support to the border guard and jungle infantry units on the ground. In 1993 the deployment became permanent as the army aviation's Amazonia Detachment in Manaus, the State of Amazonas's capital. With the fleshing up the detachment became 1st Company of the army's 2nd Helicopter Battalion, but in line with the ongoing restructuring it became 1st Squadron of the 2nd Army Aviation Group on December 15, 1993 to underline the geographical separation from Taubaté and its . An aircraft type dedicated completely to military specifications entered service in 1997 in the form of 4 Sikorsky S-70A Blackhawk. The aircraft were acquired to fulfill Brazil's role as an observer in the UN's MOMEP mission, monitoring the ceasefire after the Cenepa War between Peru and Ecuador. In 1999 these machines and personnel joined the Manaus unit, which after the disbandment of the 1st and 2nd Army Aviation Groups changed designation from 1st Squadron of the 2nd Army Aviation Group to 4th Army Aviation Squadron on September 1, 1997 along with the redesignation of the other three operational units. Unlike the 1st, 2nd and 3rd Squadrons, which were operationally under the Army Aviation Command, the 4th Army Aviation Squadron reported to the Amazon Military Command.

On January 1, 2005 the redesignation of the operational army aviation units from battalions to squadrons was reverted and they once again became 1st, 2nd, 3rd and 4th Army Aviation Battalions. On April 25, 2008 the 3rd Army Aviation Battalion was reassigned from Army Aviation Command to the Western Military Command. It remained initially at Taubaté Aviation Base, but steps for its relocation were initiated. Like the 4th Army Aviation Battalion it was decided to move the unit to an Air Force installation - the Campo Grande Air Base, which is also a civilian international airport. The actual transfer of the battalion started in February 2009 with the relocation of 6 HA-1 Fennec helicopters and the activation of the army aviation's Campo Grande Detachment. The battalion's relocation to Campo Grande with a manpower of up to 400 personnel and 16 helicopters was completed in 2012, also finalising the Brazilian Army Aviation's current order of battle, as of August 2018.

Organisation
A helicopter flight could number between four and ten aircraft. Normally a battalion includes one of each flight types, but with the introduction into service of new aircraft types such as the Eurocopter Cougar and the Jaguar and the formation of new battalions using a flight of existing battalion as the nucleus it is common to see a battalion with two general mission helicopters flights.

 Army Aviation Command based at Taubaté SP which functions as operational command
Army Aviation Directorate based Brasilia which is responsible for the logistics

Brazilian Army Aviation is organised as follows:

LAND OPERATIONS COMMAND (Brasília)

 Southeastern Military Command (São Paulo)
Army Aviation Command (Taubaté (SP))
Command
Army Aviation Signals Company
1st Army Aviation Battalion
2nd Army Aviation Battalion
Army Aviation Training Center - Taubaté-SP
Army Aviation Maintenance and Supply Battalion
Taubaté Aviation Base - Taubaté-SP
Western Military Command (Campo Grande)
3rd Army Aviation Battalion (Campo Grande (MS))
Amazon Military Command (Manaus)
4th Army Aviation Battalion (Manaus (AM))

The Army Aviation Command provides maintenance, training and doctrine support to the 3rd and 4th Army Aviation Battalions, which are outside of its command structure.

Army Aviation Command also operates and maintains the infrastructures of the Taubaté Military Airfield, thus guaranteeing the aeronautic activity of the units. The 3rd and 4th Battalions use Air Force installations - the Campo Grande and the Manaus air bases respectively.

The army aviation's original fleet of HA-1 Esquilo and HM-1 Pantera helicopters have undergone a MLU. As of 2018 the focus of the Brazilian Army Aviation is the introduction into service of additional Jaguar helicopters at Taubaté and Black Hawk helicopters at Manaus as well as forming its first fixed wing element since 1941 at the 4th Battalion at Manaus with the introduction of between 4 and 8 second-hand Short C-23B Sherpa intended to boost the logistical capabilities of the Brazilian Army in the Amazon region by connecting its capital and main transport hub with remote airstrips, suitable for STOL aircraft only. At a later point in time the Brazilian Army plans to acquire dedicated helicopters after three decades of operating light helicopters in the role with their inherent limitations. It has expressed interest in the Eurocopter Tiger, Agusta A129 Mangusta, Mil Mi-28 and the Bell AH-1Z Viper.

Aircraft

Current inventory

See also
Brazilian Naval Aviation
Brazilian Navy
Brazilian Army
Brazilian Army Aviation
Brazilian Air Force
 Army aviation

References

External links
4th Army Aviation Battalion page in Portuguese 
Army Aviation Command page in Portuguese

Army aviation units and formations
Army units and formations of Brazil